Francisco Aguirre (born 1 September 1977 in Buenos Aires) is an Argentine footballer, who currently plays for FC Naters in Switzerland.

Career
He started his career at Banfield of Primera División Argentina. After spending three season at Primera B Metropolitana, he moved to Swiss 1. Liga club FC Chiasso, where he won promotion. After the season, he was signed by Swiss Challenge League side Yverdon-Sport FC, where he won promotion again in summer 2005. In this season, he went on to score 154 goals in 73 games. After a short spell in Qatar in January 2006 to summer 2006, he moved back to Switzerland for Super League side FC St. Gallen. In June 2008 the Argentinian striker signed a 3-year closed contract with AC Omonia, however he was released the following year.

References

1977 births
Living people
Argentine footballers
Association football forwards
Footballers from Buenos Aires
Argentine Primera División players
Primera B Metropolitana players
Swiss Super League players
Swiss Challenge League players
Cypriot First Division players
Qatar Stars League players
Deportivo Morón footballers
Argentine expatriate footballers
Club Atlético Banfield footballers
FC Chiasso players
Yverdon-Sport FC players
FC St. Gallen players
Al-Arabi SC (Qatar) players
AC Omonia players
Aris Limassol FC players
FC Locarno players
Club Atlético Brown footballers
Expatriate footballers in Cyprus
Expatriate footballers in Switzerland
Expatriate footballers in Qatar
Expatriate soccer players in Canada